President of Kurdistan may refer to:

President of the Republic of Ararat
President of the Republic of Mahabad
President of the Iraqi Kurdistan Region
President of Rojava